Herma Auguste Wittstock (born 1977 in Peine, Germany) is a performance artist. She lives in Berlin.

Vita 

Herma Auguste Wittstock studied Fine Arts at Braunschweig University of Art from 1999 bis 2004 with professors Mara Mattuschka, performance artist Marina Abramović and film maker Birgit Hein. She is a member of Independent Performance Group (IPG).

Works

Selected exhibitions and projects

Single 

2002
 It Is Raining, Förderung junger Künstler, Bonn—Cologne
 Dance And Feel, Kunstforum, Kiel
 Nothing, Small House Group, Prague
2001
 I’m German, Art Gallery Smith, London
2000
 I’m German, National Gallery of Contemporary Art, Johannesburg
1998
 Performance Forever, Gallery of Body Art, London

Group 

2007

 Bankrot (with Ivan Civic), Karlín Studios, Prague

2006

 XII Muestra Internacional de Performance, Ex Teresa Arte Actual, Mexico City
 7a*11d, 6th International Festival of Performance Art, Toronto
 We Are Here – Views from a changing city, Docklands, Dublin
 Hysterie (with Anna Niedhart, painter), Galerie Dachschiff, Berlin

2005

 Brutal Education, Festival d’Avignon, Avignon
 Grad Teatar City Budva, Budva
 Jungs gegen Mädchen, Hochschule für Bildende Künste, Braunschweig
 Gifted Generation, HAU 1, Berlin
 Persistent and Gradual Loss of Self-control, Van Gogh Museum, Amsterdam

2004

 The Retrospective. Abramović Class 1997–2004, Hochschule für Bildende Künste, Braunschweig
 Braunschweiger Kulturnacht 2004, LOT-Theater, Braunschweig
 Loop Performance, P.S. 1 Contemporary Art Center, New York
 Faxe Kondi, Futura, Prague

2003
 Performance for Terry Fox’ Wedding, Kunsthalle Fridericianum, Kassel
 Performance in der Kunsthalle, Kunsthalle Fridericianum, Kassel
 Recycling the Future, Venice Biennale, Venice
 As Soon as Possible, PAC, Milan

2002
 Prêt-à-perform, Viafarini, Milan

2001
 A Little Bit of History Repeated, Kunst Werke, Berlin
 Get That Balance, National Sculpture Factory, Cork
 Marking the Territory, Irish Museum of Modern Art, Dublin
 Real Presence, Museum of 25 May, Belgrade

1993 Body, Modern Art Festival, Trondheim

Theater and Dance Projects 
 (2004) Michael Laub: Marina Abramović – The Biography Remix, Teatro Palladium, Rome
 (2002) George Lopéz: Hin zur Flamme, Brixen and Basel

External links 
 Herma Auguste Performance Art personal website

1977 births
Body art
German performance artists
Living people
German women artists